Skeppshult is a locality situated in Gislaved Municipality, Jönköping County, Sweden beside river Nissan. In 2010 365 inhabitants lived in Skeppshult.

References 

Populated places in Jönköping County
Populated places in Gislaved Municipality
Finnveden